John H. C. Taylor (born 22 June 1948) is a Scottish former footballer who played as a goalkeeper in the Scottish League for Queen's Park, Dumbarton and Stranraer.

References

1949 births
Scottish footballers
Dumbarton F.C. players
Queen's Park F.C. players
Stranraer F.C. players
Scottish Football League players
Living people
Scotland amateur international footballers
Association football goalkeepers